Largo is the third largest city in Pinellas County, Florida, United States, as well as the fourth largest in the Tampa Bay area. As of the 2020 Census, the city had a population of 82,500, up from 69,371 in 2000.

Largo was first incorporated in 1905. In 1913, it became the first municipality in Pinellas County to adopt a council-manager government. It switched back and forth from "town" to "city" a few times, and became a city again in 1974. It was an exporter of agricultural products until the 1960s population growth began to transform it into a bedroom community. Largo began as a rural farming community and became the third largest city in Florida's most densely populated county.

Largo is a sister city to Tosayamada, Kōchi, Japan, and has been named a National Arbor Day Tree City for 32 years in a row.

History

Beginnings of the area

The native inhabitants of the Largo area were the Tocobaga Indians. They are also known as the Safety Harbor culture from their archeological remains near present-day Safety Harbor. The Spanish came to Florida in the 16th century. In the 18th century, the Tocobaga had been virtually destroyed after years of exposure to European diseases, Spanish settlement efforts and warfare between Spain and England. The Largo area, like the rest of Pinellas County, was largely deserted. In 1763, Spain transferred sovereignty of Florida to The United Kingdom. In 1783, Florida fell to Spanish sovereignty once again until it was transferred to the United States in 1821. By 1845, a surveyor recorded the location of Lake Tolulu, apparently south of present-day East Bay Drive and roughly where the Largo Central Park Nature Preserve is today.

Later, homesteaders to the Largo area were the families of James and Daniel McMullen around 1852. The McMullens and other settlers raised cattle, grew citrus and vegetables and fished. During the Civil War, many Largo area residents fought for the Confederate States of America. James and Daniel McMullen were members of the "Cow Cavalry" driving Florida cattle to Georgia and the Carolinas to help sustain the war effort. Other area residents served on blockade runners. Still others left the area to serve in the Confederacy's armies. After the war, Largo area residents returned to farming, ranching, and raising citrus. The Orange Belt Railway reached the area in 1888. By this time Lake Tolulu had been renamed Lake Largo, and residents of the community west of the lake adopted the name "Largo".

Early Largo

The Town of Largo was incorporated in 1905. Lake Largo was drained in 1916 to make way for growth and development. Between 1910 and 1930, Largo's population increased about 500%. Then and for decades afterwards, Largo's economy was based on agriculture—citrus groves, cattle ranches, and hog farms, as well as turpentine stills and sawmills. Largo is best remembered as "Citrus City", from the time it was a citrus packing, canning and shipping center.

The Great Depression was unkind to Largo. Largo lacked the financial resources to meet its obligations. Largo reverted to its 1913 boundaries and charter. The population dropped approximately 30%. The debt incurred by the issuance of bonds in the late 1920s was not paid off until after World War II.

Rapid growth 

The years after World War II saw rapid growth as people began moving into the area and Largo annexed surrounding lands. During the nuclear arms race, electronics companies like General Electric and Honeywell boosted the economy. The population increased to about 5,000 in 1960, to about 20,000 in 1970, and to about 70,000 in 2005. Largo's original area was 9/16th of a square mile. The groves, farms, ranches and forests have mostly given way to homes and shopping centers and light industry. The increased population resulted in a need for increased city services. All departments saw rapid growth and improvements in quality, especially under the leadership of the late Mayor Thom Feaster. In 1995, Largo Central Park opened on the site of the old Pinellas County Fairgrounds. It is the setting for the Largo Central Park Performing Arts Center and the Largo Public Library.

In the 2006 commission elections, Largo achieved two milestones furthering its former motto of "City of Progress". Democrat Patricia Gerard became the city's first female mayor. She narrowly defeated incumbent mayor Robert E. Jackson, in a bitterly contested race. (Dr. Jackson had been the longest serving elected Democrat in Pinellas County.) The voters' choice between these two candidates decided the major issue of the election: that the city would not revert to a mayor-dominated process of governance in lieu of the continuing role for the seven-member commission acting as non-partisans—that is, deliberating independently and equally with the mayor and deciding democratically the political issues of the city.

Also, the city elected its first commissioner of African-American descent, Rodney J. Woods, in a landslide against a former commissioner.

On August 24, 2009, the iconic Largo Clock Tower, which was constructed shortly after completion of Largo Central Park, was demolished. City officials made the change because of the tower's decay and because a deteriorating landmark at a busy intersection was not an uplifting and memorable sight. The area surrounding the clock tower was replaced with a small garden area in order to incorporate the area into Largo Central Park.

Geography

Largo is located at  (27.908355, −82.777791). It is centrally located in Pinellas County, touching the Intracoastal Waterway to the southwest and Tampa Bay to the northeast. Clearwater is Largo's neighbor to the north. To the northwest are the towns of Belleair and Belleair Bluffs. The city of Pinellas Park lies south of eastern Largo. Seminole lies south of western Largo. The unincorporated community of Ridgecrest forms a large enclave between western and central Largo. A number of county enclaves pepper the City of Largo.

The city's lowest elevation is sea level. Allen's Creek drains northeast Largo, flowing into Tampa Bay. McKay Creek flows through southwest Largo into the Intracoastal Waterway. The McKay Creek basin is prone to flooding.

Climate

Largo is located on the Pinellas Peninsula, so that its climate is moderated by its proximity to the Gulf of Mexico and Tampa Bay. In the winter, temperatures are warmer on the Pinellas Peninsula than on mainland Florida. Winters are generally drier than the rest of the year. Most of the rainfall comes in the summer, when the sea breeze carries moisture from the Gulf inland.

Demographics

As of the census of 2010, there were 77, 648 people, 38,022 households, and 19,573 families residing in the city. The racial makeup of the city was 86.3% White, 5.6% African American, 0.3% Native American, 2.7% Asian, 0.2% Pacific Islander, 2.6% from other races, and 2.4% from two or more races. 9.0% of the population is Hispanic or Latino of any race.

There were 38,022 households, out of which 16.7% had children under the age of 18 living with them, 36.2% were married couples living together, 11.2% had a female householder with no husband present, and 48.5% were non-families. 39.6% of all households were made up of individuals, and 18.1% had someone living alone who was 65 years of age or older. The average household size was 2.02 and the average family size was 2.67.

In the city, the population was spread out, with 15.6% under the age of 18, 7.1% from 18 to 24, 22.6% from 25 to 44, 28.6% from 45 to 64, and 26.0% who were 65 years of age or older. The median age was 48.2 years.

As of the census of 2000, there were 69,371 people, 34,041 households, and 18,382 families residing in the city. The racial makeup of the city was 92.71% White, 2.69% African American, 0.34% Native American, 1.69% Asian, 0.08% Pacific Islander, 0.99% from other races, and 1.49% from two or more races. 4.18% of the population is Hispanic or Latino of any race.

There were 34,041 households, out of which 17.0% had children under the age of 18 living with them, 41.8% were married couples living together, 9.0% had a female householder with no husband present, and 46.0% were non-families. 38.5% of all households were made up of individuals, and 19.3% had someone living alone who was 65 years of age or older. The average household size was 1.99 and the average family size was 2.59.

In the city, the population was spread out, with 15.6% under the age of 18, 6.1% from 18 to 24, 25.1% from 25 to 44, 23.0% from 45 to 64, and 30.1% who were 65 years of age or older. The median age was 48 years. For every 100 females, there were 87.0 males. For every 100 females age 18 and over, there were 83.9 males.

The median income for a household in the city was $32,217, and the median income for a family was $41,523. Males had a median income of $30,186 versus $24,477 for females. The per capita income for the city was $20,848. About 6.0% of families and 9.1% of the population were below the poverty line, including 12.0% of those under age 18 and 8.6% of those age 65 or over.

Economy 

The decline of agriculture with population growth beginning in the 1960s largely transformed Largo into a bedroom community. Electronics, though important, could not fill the gap left by agriculture. Other light manufacturers fill various niches. The vast majority of jobs in Largo are in services and in retail sales.

The health care industry continues to grow to meet the needs of an aging population. Hospitals are among the area's strongest employers. Largo Medical Center, owned by the Hospital Corporation of America (HCA), was established in 1978; it consists of two separate campuses: its original campus near downtown Largo, and the former Sun Coast Hospital on Indian Rocks Road, which was renamed Largo Medical Center-Indian Rocks Campus after its acquisition by HCA.

At one time Largo was the headquarters of Eckerd Corporation.

Top employers

According to the city's 2018 Community Development Division, the top employers in the city are:

Arts and culture

Public library

The Largo Public Library opened in 1916 in the basement of the Town Hall, with a collection of about 560 books. In 1968, a new location was opened to house 14,000 titles. Following an expansion in 1989, the library held 250,000 items. Largo Public Library’s current building was built in 2005.

Government 
The City of Largo is governed by a City Commission of seven people elected at large to staggered, four-year terms. The mayor acts as a member and presiding officer of the Commission. The Commission's role encompasses the setting of city policy, exercising those duties imposed by the charter and law. In so doing, the City Commission executes the City's powers by the passage of resolutions and ordinances. The Commission appoints and directs the City Manager and approves the City Manager's appointments for City Attorney, Assistant City Manager, and City Clerk.

The City Manager directs the administration in governing and providing municipal services to Largo. The Administration Department includes the City Manager's Office, the City Attorney's Office, the City Clerk's Office, the Communications and Marketing Office, the Office of Management and Budget, and the City Attorney.

The City Manager is appointed by and answerable to the City Commission as a whole. The City of Largo is unique in that a supermajority of commissioners is required to terminate the City Manager. The City Manager appoints and supervises all department directors, and with Commission approval, appoints the Assistant City Manager, the City Clerk, and the City Attorney.

Education

Pinellas County Schools operates primary and secondary schools. The school district's administrative headquarters is located in Largo. Largo's high school is Largo High, and its mascot is the razorback boar. They are called the Packers because of the influence of the citrus packing industry on the town, most notably, the packing plant of Senator John Taylor.

Largo's middle school is Largo Middle. The school colors are orange and black and the mascot is a tiger.

Schiller International University's main campus is in Largo.

St. Patricks Catholic School has a campus on Trotter Road in Largo, providing a private education for grades Pre-K–8th grade. Other private schools in the city include Veritas Academy.

Infrastructure

Transportation

Largo is served by two international airports, Tampa International Airport and St. Petersburg-Clearwater International Airport. The Pinellas Suncoast Transit Authority provides bus service throughout Pinellas County and express service to Tampa. State Roads 686 and 688 pass through Largo to connect with Interstate 275, which connects with I-75. US 19 and US 19 Alternate run north-to-south through Largo. A grid of county roads connects Largo with its neighbors.

Notable people

 Beth Bauer, former LPGA golfer
 Michael Bradley, current PGA golfer
 Irene Cara, American Singer 
 Al Conover, former American football player and coach
 Sarah Mavis Dabbs, All-American Girls Professional Baseball League player
 D'Qwell Jackson, NFL linebacker, Indianapolis Colts
 Chloe Lowery, singer-songwriter
 Dexter McCluster, NFL running back/wide receiver, Kansas City Chiefs
 Brittney McConn, retired figure skater
 Casey Moore, current Nevada Wolf Pack running backs coach
 Lanny Poffo, professional wrestler. 
 Leonard T. Schroeder, retired U.S. Army colonel, first soldier ashore on D-Day in World War II
 John Stansel Taylor, Florida state senator
 Bill Young, U.S. Congressman
 Anastasija Zolotic, First American woman to win an Olympic gold medal in Taekwondo

Sister cities

Kami (Kōchi, Japan) – since 1969

See also 

 History of Florida
 Maritime history of Florida

References

Further reading 
 City of Largo. Citizen's Academy Handbook. Largo. 2003.
 Coughlin, Leo. Around Here Clearwater Gazette. June 23, 2005.
 de Quesada, Jr., A.M. and Luisi, Vincent. Images of America: Pinellas County. Tempus Publishing. Charleston, SC. 1998.
 Milanich, Jerald T., Florida Indians and the Invasion from Europe. University Press of Florida: Gainesville. 1995. In Who Were the Tocobago Indians?. December 20, 2005.
 Pinellas County Planning Department as staff for the Pinellas County Planning Council. Pinellas County Historical Background.

External links

 City of Largo official website
 "How Largo got its name, maybe", St. Petersburg Times
 Largo Area Historical Society

 
1905 establishments in Florida
Cities in Pinellas County, Florida
Populated places on the Intracoastal Waterway in Florida
Cities in Florida
Populated places established in the 19th century